NGC 4326 is a barred spiral galaxy with a ring located about 330 million light-years away in the constellation Virgo. It was discovered by astronomer William Herschel on April 13, 1784, who described it as "vF, S, R, bM, 1st of 3". It is a large galaxy, with a diameter of around  making it nearly twice the size of the Milky Way. NGC 4326 is also classified as a LINER galaxy. Despite being listed in the Virgo Cluster catalog as VCC 623, it is not a member of the Virgo Cluster but instead a background galaxy.

Nearby Galaxies
NGC 4326 forms a pair with the galaxy NGC 4333, known as [T2015] nest 102514, in which NGC 4326 is the birghtest member of the pair. Both galaxies are part of the CfA2 Great Wall.

See also
 List of NGC objects (4001–5000)

External links

References

4326
040192
Virgo (constellation)
Astronomical objects discovered in 1784
Barred spiral galaxies
LINER galaxies
Ring galaxies
07454
Great Wall filament